Ergane is a genus of jumping spiders that was first described by Ludwig Carl Christian Koch in 1881. The form of the pedipalp and the abdominal pattern suggest that Ergane is close to Chalcotropis. It is named after the goddess Athena, called Athena Ergane as the patron of craftsmen and artisans.

Species
 it contains four species, found in the Philippines, Indonesia, Australia, and Kiribati:
Ergane benjarei (Peckham & Peckham, 1907) – Borneo
Ergane carinata Berry, Beatty & Prószyński, 1996 – Philippines, Caroline Is.
Ergane cognata L. Koch, 1881 (type) – Australia (Northern Territory)
Ergane insulana L. Koch, 1881 – Australia

References

Salticidae genera
Salticidae
Spiders of Asia
Spiders of Australia
Taxa named by Ludwig Carl Christian Koch